Morning, Noon & the Nite-Liters is the second album by the Louisville, Kentucky group The Nite-Liters, the instrumental ensemble offshoot of New Birth, featuring Tony Churchill, James Baker, Robin Russell, Austin Lander, Robert "Lurch" Jackson, Leroy Taylor, Charlie Hearndon, Bruce Marshall and Nathaniel "Nebs" Neblett.

The album was released in 1971 on RCA Records and produced by mentor Harvey Fuqua. It includes the original version of "K-Jee" that was covered in 1975 by MFSB on their Universal Love album.

Track listing
"Tanga Boo Gonk" (3:15)
"If I Were Your Woman" (5:36)
"K-Jee" (4:01)
"Funky-Doo" (4:52)
"Stinkin' Charlie" (2:19)
"Hang-Up" (4.39)
"Traveling/Listen Here" (4:17)
"We've Only Just Begun" (3:14)
"Kool-Pick" (3:24)
"(We've Got To) Pull Together" (5:43)

Charts

Singles

References

External links
 The Nite-Liters-Morning, Noon &The Nite-Liters at Discogs

1971 albums
The Nite-Liters albums
RCA Records albums
Albums produced by Harvey Fuqua